Nice and Slow may refer to:
 Nice & Slow (album), a 2001 album by Brian Culbertson
 "Nice and Slow" (Jesse Green song), 1976
 "Nice 'N' Slow", a 1988 song by Freddie Jackson
 "Nice & Slow", a 1997 song by Usher